Jiangpu Park is an interchange station. The station began operations when Line 12 opened on 29 December 2013, followed by Line 18 on 30 December 2021.

Station layout

References

Railway stations in Shanghai
Line 12, Shanghai Metro
Line 18, Shanghai Metro
Shanghai Metro stations in Yangpu District
Railway stations in China opened in 2013